The San Diego Gulls are a professional ice hockey team in the American Hockey League (AHL) that began play in the 2015–16 season. Based in San Diego, California, and affiliated with the National Hockey League's Anaheim Ducks, the Gulls play their home games at the Pechanga Arena.

The team is the fifth hockey team in San Diego to use the "Gulls" name.  The Gulls are a relocation of the former Norfolk Admirals franchise, joining six other AHL franchises to form a new AHL Pacific Division.

History
On January 29, 2015, the Anaheim Ducks announced that they would purchase their AHL affiliate, the Norfolk Admirals, and would be moving the team to San Diego as one of five charter members of the AHL's new Pacific Division.  The team plays at the Pechanga Arena San Diego, the sixth professional hockey team to play there, following the original San Diego Gulls of the WHL (1966–74), the San Diego Mariners of the WHA (1974–77), the San Diego Hawks/Mariners of the Pacific Hockey League (1977–79), the second San Diego Gulls of the IHL (1990–1995), and the third San Diego Gulls of the West Coast Hockey League (1995–2003) and later the ECHL (2003–06).

The Gulls' name, logo and colors were revealed on February 22, 2015 at HockeyFest. HockeyFest was deemed a success, drawing over 8,500 enthusiastic hockey fans.

The San Diego Gulls played their first home game on October 10, 2015, against the Grand Rapids Griffins. The team finished its inaugural season with an average attendance of 8,675, second in the league after the Hershey Bears.

After four seasons and three playoff appearances, the Anaheim Ducks promoted Gulls' head coach Dallas Eakins to the same position with the Ducks. Former Florida Panthers' head coach Kevin Dineen was hired as the next head coach.

Approaching the delayed 2020–21 season, due to COVID-19 pandemic considerations, the Gulls announced they would temporarily relocate and play the season out of the Ducks' practice rink, Great Park Ice & FivePoint Arena, in Irvine, California. The Gulls finished third in the Pacific Division and lost in the semifinals to the second place Bakersfield Condors in division postseason tournament. After two seasons, the Ducks did not extend head coach Dineen, instead hiring former Laval Rocket head coach Joel Bouchard. After a lackluster season under Bouchard, the Gulls would hire longtime AHL head coach Roy Sommer to be their 4th head coach in team history.

Rivalries
The Gulls consider the Ontario Reign, the Los Angeles Kings AHL affiliate, to be their main rivals and advertise games as "Rivalry Night." The teams faced each other in the 2016 division finals, where the Reign defeated the Gulls 4–1 in a best-of-seven series. San Diego then defeated the Reign in the 2017 Calder Cup playoffs 3-games-to-2 in the division semifinals.

Season-by-season records

Players

Current roster
Updated March 19, 2023.

|}

Team captains

 Joe Piskula, 2015–16
 Jaycob Megna, 2018–19
 Sam Carrick, 2019–21
 Greg Pateryn, 2021–22
 Chase De Leo, 2022–present

Team records and leaders

Scoring leaders
These are the top-ten point-scorers for the San Diego Gulls in the AHL. Figures are updated after each completed season.

Note: Pos = Position; GP = Games Played; G = Goals; A = Assists; Pts = Points; P/G = Points per game;  = current  Gulls player

References

External links
 San Diego Gulls Official Website

 
1
Ice hockey teams in San Diego
Ice hockey clubs established in 2015
Ice hockey teams in California
2015 establishments in California